CASPer (Computer-Based Assessment for Sampling Personal Characteristics also "CMSENS")  is an admissions test developed by Harold Reiter and Kelly Dore. Made for the McMaster University's Program for Educational Research and Development, it has been used by the McMaster University Medical School since 2010. The test was developed to assess an academic applicant's personal and professional attributes in the pre-screening stage of the application process. The test, which is a form of situational judgement test, has 12 sections that either consist of video- or word-based scenarios, based on real-life situations. Candidates have five minutes to answer three questions.

CASPer was piloted by Northern Ontario School of Medicine in the 2014 application cycle. In 2015 the test was adopted by three medical schools: the University of Ottawa Faculty of Medicine, Robert Wood Johnson Medical School and New York Medical College. It is currently in use at over 70 medical schools worldwide.

Braden MacBeth criticised CASPer on Science-Based Medicine for lack of transparency, flawed studies and a conflict of interest. MacBeth concludes "CASPer should not be incorporated into the medical school admissions process".

References 

Tests